is a Japanese voice actress and singer.

Filmography

Anime

Video games

Dubbing

References

External links
 
Official agency profile (archive) 
Saori Gotō at Seiyuu Info
Saori Gotō at GamePlaza-Haruka Voice Acting Database 
Saori Gotō at Hitoshi Doi's Seiyuu Database

1987 births
Living people
Voice actresses from Yokohama
Japanese voice actresses
81 Produce voice actors